Anders Nøhr (born September 3, 1981) is a former Danish professional football player, who played for the FC Midtjylland, AC Horsens, Esbjerg fB and returned to Danish Superliga side AC Horsens. He retired from his professional football career by the end of 2012. He played as defender and midfielder.

External links
AC Horsens profile
Career statistics at Danmarks Radio

1981 births
Living people
Danish men's footballers
FC Midtjylland players
AC Horsens players
Esbjerg fB players
Danish Superliga players
Ikast FS players
People from Ikast-Brande Municipality
Association football midfielders
Association football defenders
Sportspeople from the Central Denmark Region